The 1936 Central State Bearcats football team represented Central State Teachers College, later renamed Central Michigan University, as an independent during the 1936 college football season. In their third and final season under head coach Alex Yunevich, the Bearcats compiled a 3–4–1 record and were outscored by their opponents by a combined total of 129 to 89.

Schedule

References

External links
 1937 Chippewa yearbook

Central State
Central Michigan Chippewas football seasons
Central State Bearcats football